David Kim (born 24 May 1963) is a violinist born in Carbondale, Illinois and was the only American to win a prize at the International Tchaikovsky Competition in Moscow in 1986, where he got sixth prize. Since 1999, he has been the concertmaster of the Philadelphia Orchestra. He has played with the All-Star Orchestra and performed with orchestras in Dallas, Pittsburgh, Sacramento, Korea, and Moscow.

Kim resides in a Philadelphia suburb with his wife and two daughters. He also serves on the advisory board of the San Jose Youth Symphony.

The instrument Kim uses is a  1757 J.B. Guadagnini made in Milan, Italy. It is on loan from the Philadelphia Orchestra.

Career
Kim's studies of violin started at three. He started studying with Dorothy DeLay at eight. Kim studied at the Juilliard School and received his bachelor's and master's degrees. He has been playing as concertmaster with the Philadelphia Orchestra since 1999. He is also a soloist in The Philadelphia Orchestra as well as many other orchestras in the world.

References

External links
 

American male violinists
Concertmasters
Concertmasters of the Philadelphia Orchestra
Living people
1963 births
21st-century classical violinists
21st-century American male musicians
Juilliard School alumni
Classical musicians from Illinois
Musicians of the Philadelphia Orchestra
Male classical violinists
21st-century American violinists